Lame Deer (1821-1877), also called "The Elk that Whistles Running," was a first chief of the Miniconjou Lakota (trans. "They who plant by the water") and vice chief of the Wakpokinyan (trans. "To Fly along the river") band.

Biography
Lame Deer was the second signatory of the 1865 Treaty With The Sioux-Miniconjou Band at Fort Sully, Dakota Territory (now just southeast of Pierre, South Dakota): "Tah-ke-chah-hoosh-tay, The Lame Deer, 1st chief of the Minneconjon band of Dakota or Sioux Indians". This group of Lakota were opposed to the 1868 Treaty of Fort Laramie, which required the Lakota to cede much of their territory to the United States. Lame Deer's band of Miniconjou participated in all of the fighting against United States troops during the Sioux War of 1876, including the Battle of the Greasy Grass, also known as the Battle of the Little Bighorn, where the combined Lakota and allied forces dealt an overwhelming defeat to United States forces.

Until 1877, Lame Deer and his followers continued to roam free around the Powder River area of Montana. The rest of the Sioux had surrendered to the United States or crossed into Canda with Sitting Bull. Colonel Nelson A. Miles tracked Lame Deer's group to a tributary of the Rosebud known to the whites as the Big Muddy and to the Indians as Fat Horse Creek, about 1 mile southwest of the present-day town of Lame Deer, Montana. On May 7, 1877, soldiers under Miles's command attacked Lame Deer's encampment. Lame Deer was in the process of surrendering to Miles when a white scout aimed his rifle at Lame Deer. According to Miles, who was grasping Lame Deer's hand at the time, Lame Deer must have believed that he would be killed even if he surrendered. Lame Deer then pulled free and grabbed his rifle. He fired at Miles, missing him but killing a soldier. Lame Deer was shot in the ensuing gunfight and later died. Lame Deer was the grandfather of John Fire Lame Deer who was born in the twentieth century.

References

Further reading
Josephine Waggoner, Witness: a Húņkpapĥa historian's Strong-Heart song of the Lakotas, University of Nebraska Press 2013, edited & foreword by Emily Levine . 
Barbara Fifer, Montana Battlefields 1806-1877: Native Americans And the U.S. Army at War, Farcountry Press 2005 .
Jerome A. Greene, Lakota and Cheyenne: Indian Views of the Great Sioux War, 1876-1877, University of Oklahoma Press 2000 .
Kingsley M. Bray, Crazy Horse: A Lakota Life, University of Oklahoma Press 2008 .
John (Fire) Lame Deer and Richard Erdoes, Lame Deer, Seeker of Visions, Washington Square Press 1972.

1821 births
1877 deaths
Lakota leaders
People of the American Old West
Miniconjou people